is a Japanese anime label and subsidiary of Fuji TV. Founded in 2019, the label produces boys' love (yaoi) anime films exclusively.

History
Development of Blue Lynx began in 2017 through the efforts of Yuka Okayasu, a producer at Fuji TV who previously worked on the network's Noitamina anime programming block. After noting that Fuji TV's existing programming blocks Noitamina and +Ultra seek to appeal to a broad audience of anime viewers, she sought to develop a label that would conversely appeal to a niche audience of yaoi fans. Development of the label was aided by the critical and commercial success of the live-action boys' love television dramas Ossan's Love on TV Asahi and Pornographer on Fuji TV on Demand (FOD), which demonstrated the popularity of the genre to executives at Fuji. As the sexual content of yaoi manga is necessarily limited in television anime adaptations due to broadcast standards and practices, it was determined that Blue Lynx would produce anime film adaptations exclusively.

Blue Lynx was announced on April 22, 2019 through Twitter, with an announcement that the first project of the label would be revealed on April 26, 2019. Gekkou wa Kimi no Sasayaki (Moonlight is Your Whisper), a five-part short story by Shion Miura with illustrations by Yoko Tanji, was posted on the studio's Twitter and website in the days leading up to the announcement. Its first production, a film adaptation of the manga Twittering Birds Never Fly, was announced on April 26, 2019 by Grizzly.

The label's title is a reference to "BL", the acronym for boys' love, as well as a reference to blue ocean vs. red ocean marketing theory, in regards to the untapped potential of the boys' love market.

Titles

See also
 Noitamina, a Fuji TV anime programming block
 +Ultra, a Fuji TV anime programming block

Notes

References

External links 
 Blue Lynx official website

Yaoi
Fuji TV
LGBT-related mass media in Japan
LGBT in anime and manga
Japanese animation studios